Camila Giorgi was the defending champion of the 2016 Ricoh Open, but withdrew before the tournament began. 

Sixth-seeded Coco Vandeweghe won the title, defeating Kristina Mladenovic in the final, 7–5, 7–5.

Seeds

Draw

Finals

Top half

Bottom half

Qualifying

Seeds

Qualifiers

Lucky losers
  Aleksandra Krunić

Draw

First qualifier

Second qualifier

Third qualifier

Fourth qualifier

Fifth qualifier

Sixth qualifier

References
 Main draw
 Qualifying draw

Ricoh Openandnbsp;- Singles
2016 Women's Singles